Joaquín Indacoechea (born 8 September 2000) is an Argentine professional footballer who plays as a midfielder for Aldosivi.

Club career
In 2015, Indacoechea was diagnosed with Burkitt's lymphoma, a rare lymphatic cancer. He fully recovered in 2016, and returned to football with Aldosivi. Indacoechea made his professional debut with Aldosivi in a 5-1 Argentine Primera División loss to Rosario Central on 26 November 2019.

References

External links

2000 births
Living people
Argentine people of Basque descent
Sportspeople from Buenos Aires Province
Argentine footballers
Association football midfielders
Argentine Primera División players
Aldosivi footballers